Fürth Klinikum station is a Nuremberg U-Bahn station.

Located on the U1 in Fürth, the station was opened on 12 December 2004. It is one of two opportunities to change between the U1 and the S1 of the S-Bahn Nuremberg in Fürth, the other being Fürth Hauptbahnhof. In the course of the quadruple tracking of the Nuremberg-Bamberg mainline it is planned to rename the S-Bahn stop currently called "Unterfarnbach" to "Fürth - Klinikum" to make the connection to the U-Bahn more apparent.

References

Nuremberg U-Bahn stations
Railway stations in Germany opened in 2004